The Laguna Seca Formation is a geologic formation in California. It preserves fossils dating back to the Paleogene period.

See also

 List of fossiliferous stratigraphic units in California
 Paleontology in California

References 

Geologic formations of California
Maastrichtian Stage of North America
Cretaceous–Paleogene boundary
Paleogene stratigraphic units of North America
Danian Stage
Sandstone formations
Conglomerate formations
Shallow marine deposits